Sean Whyte (born May 4, 1970) is a Canadian former professional ice hockey player who briefly played for the Los Angeles Kings in the NHL. Whyte was born in Sudbury, Ontario.

Career statistics

External links
 

1970 births
Anaheim Bullfrogs players
Canadian ice hockey right wingers
Cornwall Aces players
El Paso Buzzards players
Fort Worth Fire players
Guelph Platers players
Ice hockey people from Ontario
Sportspeople from Greater Sudbury
Living people
Los Angeles Kings draft picks
Los Angeles Kings players
Owen Sound Platers players
Phoenix Cobras players
Phoenix Mustangs players
Phoenix Roadrunners (IHL) players
Tulsa Oilers (1992–present) players
Worcester IceCats players
Canadian expatriate ice hockey players in the United States